Mediterranean Day (also known as International Day of the Mediterranean and Day of the Mediterranean) is the annual commemoration of the foundation of the Barcelona Process on 28 November 1995. It is celebrated in the Mediterranean Basin, as well as in the European Union countries.

Background 
The Barcelona Process was launched in the Euro-Mediterranean Conference in Barcelona on 28 November 1995 with the aim of strengthening relations between Europe and the Southern Mediterranean countries. On that date, the ministers of Foreign Affairs of the EU and 12 southern and eastern Mediterranean countries held the conference and signed an agreement to launch the Euro-Mediterranean Partnership Process. The Barcelona Process was born as a new dialogue framework out of a vocation to convert the Mediterranean region into a common space for peace, stability, security and shared socio-economic progress and dialogue between peoples.

The Barcelona Process would lead to the creation of the Union for the Mediterranean (UfM) in 2008.

The first Day of the Mediterranean was celebrated on 28 of November 2021, with over 75 activities in 18 Euro-Mediterranean countries.

Footnotes

References

Further reading 

 Joffe, George; Vasconcelos, Alvaro. The Barcelona Process: Building a Euro-Mediterranean Regional Community. Routledge, 2000.

External links 

 Day of the Mediterranean (website)
Statement of UfM Member states declaring the Day of the Mediterranean (PDF)
N1 Media outlet Croatia: November 28 declared Day of the Mediterranean
European Union Neighbours: The International Day of the Mediterranean is born
Spanish News Agency Europa Press: Declaran el 28 de noviembre 'Día Internacional del Mediterráneo'
Italian News Agency Ansamet: November 28 will be International Day of the Mediterranean
News outlet Econostrum: The UfM proclaims 28 November as "International Day of the Mediterranean"
Spanish Presidential Ministry Press Release: "Arancha González Laya announces agreement of foreign ministers of Union for the Mediterranean to declare 28 November as "Mediterranean Day"

International organization days
Mediterranean
November observances